Rodney Saint-Éloi is a Haitian-Canadian poet. He is a two-time nominee for the Governor General's Award for French-language poetry, at the 2013 Governor General's Awards for Jacques Roche, je t'écris cette lettre and at the 2016 Governor General's Awards for Je suis la fille du baobab brûlé.

Born and raised in Cavaellon, Haiti, he moved to Montreal in 2001. He was a founder of the Haitian publishing company Éditions Mémoire in 1991, and has published poetry collections including J'avais une ville d’eau, de terre et d'arc-en-ciel heureux (1999), J’ai un arbre dans ma pirogue (2003) and Récitatif au pays des ombres (2011).

References

21st-century Canadian poets
21st-century Haitian poets
Canadian male poets
Haitian male poets
Canadian poets in French
Haitian emigrants to Canada
Writers from Montreal
Black Canadian writers
Living people
People from Sud (department)
21st-century Canadian male writers
Year of birth missing (living people)